Selin Kara (born 20 January 1981) is a Turkish-born chemist and biotechnologist. She is currently a full professor and head of Industrial Biotechnology section at Aarhus University. She studies biocatalysis and has been recognized for her work about deep eutectic solvents and her research regarding cofactor regeneration in biotransformations.

Books and publications 

 Recent trends and novel concepts in cofactor-dependent biotransformations
 Deep eutectic solvents as efficient solvents in biocatalysis
 Enantioselective oxidation of aldehydes catalyzed by alcohol dehydrogenase
 Access to lactone building blocks via horse liver alcohol dehydrogenase-catalyzed oxidative lactonization
 One-pot combination of enzyme and Pd nanoparticle catalysis for the synthesis of enantiomerically pure 1,2-amino alcohols
 A bi‐enzymatic convergent cascade for ε‐caprolactone synthesis employing 1, 6‐hexanediol as a ‘double‐smart cosubstrate’
 More efficient redox biocatalysis by utilising 1, 4-butanediol as a ‘smart cosubstrate’
 A fed‐batch synthetic strategy for a three‐step enzymatic synthesis of poly‐ϵ‐caprolactone

Awards and honors 

 2018 - ChemCatChem - Young Researcher Series
 2016 - Selected Membership of Zukunftsforum Biotechnologie DECHEMA
 2015 - DAAD Conference Travel Award
 2014 - Conference Travel Award – Frauenförderung at TU Dresden
 2013 - Biotrans 2013 Poster Prize

References 

1981 births
Living people
Turkish chemists
Turkish biochemists